Krummi svaf í klettagjá is a traditional Icelandic rhyming poem by Jón Thoroddsen about a raven. The poem was written in the middle of the 19th century and is in 6 line stanzas of AABCCB form. In Iceland it is often repeated as part of a well known folk song

Translation
The opening verse can be roughly translated as follows:

In Icelandic 
Krummi svaf í klettagjá,

kaldri vetrarnóttu á,
verður margt að meini

Fyrr en dagur fagur rann,

freðið nefið dregur hann
undan stórum steini.

In English 

Krummi sleeps among the stones

on a cold winter night.
(There is much to be said)

Before the passage of a fine day

His nose pulls him
from a large rock~

References

Volkslied
19th-century literature
Icelandic literature